It Was Him: The Many Murders of Ed Edwards is an American documentary television series that premiered on April 16, 2018 on Paramount Network.

Premise
It Was Him: The Many Murders of Ed Edwards follows Wayne Wolfe who "discovered that his real grandfather was the deceased killer Ed Edwards who was convicted of five cold cases in his 70s, but had potentially embarked on a decades-long murder spree. The series examines the infamous murderer through an investigation led by Wolfe and John Cameron, a cold-case expert and retired detective who has been investigating Edwards for almost a decade. Cameron’s meticulously compiled evidence has Edwards as the ultimate suspect in some of the most well-known murder cases, including the Zodiac Killer, Laci Peterson and many more."

Production

Development
On November 10, 2016, it was announced that Spike had given the production a series order. The limited series was expected to air under a new "Spike Serialized" franchise for limited-run non-scripted series. The production was developed by Objective Media Group’s Jimmy Fox, who will executive produce, along with Wolfe and the showrunning team Jackson Nguyen and Todd Crites of Turn Left Productions. Additional executive producers included Leonid Leonov and Kenny Dale Borill as well as Objective/All3Media's Layla Smith and Greg Lipstone.

On March 16, 2018, it was announced that the series would premiere on Paramount Network on April 16, 2018.

Release

Marketing
Alongside the announcement of the series' premiere, Paramount Network released the official trailer.

Episodes

Reception
In a mixed review, The Hollywood Reporters Daniel Fienberg described the series as "half outlandish serial killer conspiracy theory, half portrait of obsession, neither completely satisfying" and said that it was "often disturbing, occasionally entertaining, never convincing."

References

External links
 

2010s American documentary television series
2018 American television series debuts
2018 American television series endings
English-language television shows
Paramount Network original programming